Citral is an acyclic monoterpene aldehyde, and being a monoterpene, it is made of two isoprene units. Citral is a collective term which covers two geometric isomers that have their own separate names; the E-isomer is named geranial (trans-citral) or citral A. The Z-isomer is named neral (cis-citral) or citral B. These stereoisomers occur as a mixture, not necessarily racemic; e.g. in essential oil of Australian ginger, the neral to geranial ratio is 0.61.

Occurrence 
Citral is present in the oils of several plants, including lemon myrtle (90–98%), Litsea citrata (90%), Litsea cubeba (70–85%), lemongrass (65–85%), lemon tea-tree (70–80%), Ocimum gratissimum (66.5%), Lindera citriodora (about 65%), Calypranthes parriculata (about 62%), petitgrain (36%), lemon verbena (30–35%), lemon ironbark (26%), lemon balm (11%), lime (6–9%), lemon (2–5%), and orange. Further, in the lipid fraction (essential oil) of Australian ginger (51–71%) Of the many sources of citral, the Australian myrtaceous tree, lemon myrtle, Backhousia citriodora F. Muell. (of the family Myrtaceae), is considered superior.

Uses 
Citral has a strong lemon (citrus) scent and is used as an aroma compound in perfumery. It is used to fortify lemon oil. (Nerol, another perfumery compound, has a less intense but sweeter lemon note.) The aldehydes citronellal and citral are considered key components responsible for the lemon note with citral preferred.

It also has pheromonal effects in acari and insects.

Citral is used in the synthesis of vitamin A, lycopene, ionone and methylionone, and to mask the smell of smoke.

The herb Cymbopogon citratus has shown promising insecticidal and antifungal activity against storage pests.

Food additive 
Citral is commonly used as a food additive ingredient.

It has been tested (2016) in vitro against the food-borne pathogen Cronobacter sakazakii.

Medical exploration 
In a report (1997), Citral is mentioned as cytotoxic to P(388) mouse leukaemia cells.
It has 'strong' antimicrobial qualities.

Adverse effects 
Two studies showed 1–1.7% of people to be allergic to citral, with allergies frequently reported. Citral on its own is strongly sensitizing to allergies; the International Fragrance Association recommends that citral only be used in association with substances that prevent a sensitizing effect. Citral has been extensively tested, with no known genotoxicity or carcinogenic effect.

See also 
 Citronellal
 Geraniol
 Limonene
 Nerol
 Vaporizer

References

External links 
 MSDS

Flavors
Perfume ingredients
Monoterpenes
Conjugated aldehydes